The Kew Bulletin is a quarterly peer-reviewed scientific journal on plant and fungal taxonomy and conservation published by Springer Science+Business Media on behalf of the Royal Botanic Gardens, Kew. Articles on palynology, cytology, anatomy, phytogeography, and phytochemistry that relate to taxonomy are also included.

The journal was established in 1887 as the Kew Bulletin of Miscellaneous Information by William Turner Thiselton-Dyer, then director of the Royal Botanic Gardens, Kew. It sought to facilitate communication between botanists at Kew and distant parts of the British Empire, and prioritised study of information of economic importance.

Abstracting and indexing 
The journal is abstracted and indexed in:

References

External links 

Botany journals
Publications established in 1887
Springer Science+Business Media academic journals
Quarterly journals
English-language journals